Glen Radford (born 27 February 1962) is a former cricketer. Born in Luanshya, Zambia, he played at first-class and List A level for Eastern Transvaal, Western Transvaal and WT's successor North West in the 1990s.

He is the brother of two other significant cricketers: Neal Radford and Wayne Radford.

External links
Glen Radford from CricketArchive.

Zambian people of English descent
Zambian emigrants to South Africa
Zambian cricketers
South African cricketers
1962 births
Living people
North West cricketers
Easterns cricketers
People from Luanshya